is the fourth studio album by Japanese singer-songwriter Mari Hamada, released on January 21, 1985 by Invitation. It features collaborations with B'z guitarist Tak Matsumoto and two English-language cover songs. The album was reissued alongside Hamada's past releases on January 15, 2014.

Track listing

Personnel 
 Tak Matsumoto – guitar
 Yoshihiro Naruse – bass
 Masahiko Rokukawa – bass
 Yōgo Kōno – keyboards
 Tohru Hasebe – drums

Footnotes

References

External links 
  (Mari Hamada)
  (Victor Entertainment)
 
 

1985 albums
Japanese-language albums
Mari Hamada albums
Albums produced by Daiko Nagato
Victor Entertainment albums